Sir John Lawson (born ca. 16151665 Scarborough, North Yorkshire) was an English naval officer and republican.

Lawson was in command of ships in the parliament's service during and after the English Civil War, 1642–6, 1651–3, 1654–6. He was dismissed from the public service, apparently on political grounds in 1656. An anabaptist and republican, he was implicated in the conspiracy of the Fifth Monarchists and arrested in 1657. However, soon released, he was appointed commander-in-chief of the fleet by rump-parliament in 1659 to counter General at sea Edward Montagu. But later on both co-operated with General George Monck in the restoration of the monarchy in 1660. A grateful King Charles II of England knighted him in 1660.

In June 1661, with his flag in the Swiftsure, Lawson accompanied Montagu, now earl of Sandwich, to the Mediterranean to stem the burgeoning corsair activity. Lawson was present when Sandwich and the earl of Peterborough took over Tangier and he bought property in the new English possession; Lawson had been enthusiastic in support of taking Tangier when questioned by the King. When Sandwich went to Lisbon to conduct the new Queen Catherine of Braganza to England, Lawson remained in command of a strong squadron with instructions to coerce Algiers, Tunis, and Tripoli into observing treaties not to molest English shipping. After capturing several corsair ships, releasing some two hundred captives and selling about the same number of Moors into slavery, he compelled them to renew the treaties. He returned to England for the winter of 1662–3, and again for that of 1663–1664; and the Algerines, seizing the opportunity, recommenced their piracies. In May Lawson was again in the Mediterranean, but before the corsairs could be reduced he was ordered home.

Commissioned as the vice-admiral of the red squadron for the Second Anglo-Dutch War in 1665, he died of a wound received at the battle of Lowestoft.

Attribution

Further reading

References

1610s births
1665 deaths
People from Scarborough, North Yorkshire
English military personnel killed in action
Roundheads
Knights Bachelor
English republicans
Royal Navy personnel of the Second Anglo-Dutch War
Royal Navy vice admirals
People in English Tangier